The Bradford Rattlers are a Canadian junior ice hockey team based out of Bradford, Ontario, and members of the Greater Metro Junior A Hockey League.  The Rattlers, then known as the Bradford Bulls, were bought out towards the end of the 2005–06 season by a local group of investors for the purpose of moving the team up to Junior "A" from the Georgian Mid-Ontario Junior C Hockey League.

History
The Bradford Vasey Juniors were founded in 1971 as they joined the South-Central Junior "D" Hockey League.  The league soon became the Central Junior "C", then the Mid-Ontario Junior "C", and finally after merging with the Georgian Junior "C" league became the Georgian Mid-Ontario Junior "C" Hockey League.  Their team's first championship was the Junior "D" OHA Cup in 1973.  They won the All-Ontario Junior "D" title by defeating the Mitchell Hawks 4-games-to-1.  That summer, the SCJDHL was promoted to Junior "C" for the 1974–75 season, and changed their name to the Bradford Blues for the 1975–76 season. In 1980, Bradford won their league and went all the way to the Clarence Schmalz Cup All-Ontario Final.  In the end, they lost out to the Leamington Flyers 4-games-straight.  In 1986, they made it all the way back to the All-Ontario final only to lose to the Norwich Merchants 4-games-to-3.  The team changed its name to Bradford Bulls for the 1988–89 season, in which they immediately struck gold; they won their league and then followed it up with a 4-games-to-2 series victory to defeat the Hanover Barons to win their only ever Clarence Schmalz Cup.  The Bulls won the league again in 1998, but did not reach the All-Ontario Final.  The Most valuable Player of the playoffs was Noah Bell, who was drafted into the Ontario Hockey League a year later by the Sudbury Wolves. 

The Bradford Bulls were bought out towards the end of the 2005–06 season by a local party who owned an independent Junior "A" travelling team known as the Toronto Rattlers, though technically a Toronto-area franchise. The Rattlers toured the United States playing games in junior hockey tournaments and against college teams from 2004 until 2006. A number of alumni received US college offers and Russian-based player Kirill Tulupov, who made his presence known in North America by touring with the Toronto Rattlers, was taken by the New Jersey Devils in the third round of the 2006 NHL Entry Draft. The new ownership group believed that combining the operations and management of the thirty-five-year-old Branford franchise with the experience of the Toronto Rattlers would earn the Bradford franchise a move up to the Ontario Provincial Junior A Hockey League, but when the Ontario Hockey Association (OHA) turned down the request the team walked away from the OHA's version of Junior "A". The Bradford franchise adopted the nickname of the now disbanded travelling team, and the Bradford Rattlers became a member of the Greater Metro Junior A Hockey League (GMHL).

2006–07
The Bradford Rattlers first game in the GMHL was against the South Muskoka Shield on September 15, 2006, in Gravenhurst, Ontario.  The Rattlers dismantled the Shield, winning by a score of 10–1.  Andreas Goetz picked up the team's first Junior "A" victory in net.  Their first home game was on September 17, 2006, against the Toronto Canada Moose, a 5–3 win.

On September 24, 2006, the Bradford Rattlers became the last undefeated team of the GMHL's inaugural season, moving to 5–0–0–0, defeating the (until then undefeated) Richmond Hill Rams by a score of 3–1.  The winning streak lasted until October 15, 2006, 10–0–0–0, as the Rattlers picked up an overtime loss to the King Wild, but still had yet to lose a game in regulation.  On January 21, 2007, the Rattlers had compiled a 27–0–0–4 record before playing the Deseronto Thunder. The Thunder were leading 5–2 but Bradford came only to lose for the first time in regulation by a score of 6–5.

The Rattlers finished the season in first place, earning a bye into the league semifinals.  Their semifinals opponent was the Deseronto Thunder.  The Thunder won the first two games of the series.  The Rattlers pulled themselves together and won the next four games straight to play in the league finals.  The finals were against the league's second seeded King Wild.  The Rattlers started with a 2–1 victory but the Wild won the second game 6–3 to even the series.  The Rattlers came back and won the next game 5–0 while the fourth and fifth games went to overtime with Bradford winning 2–1 and 4–3, respectively. The Bradford Rattlers won the first ever Bob Russell Cup as GMHL Champions.

The Rattlers faced the WHA Junior West Hockey League's New Westminster Whalers for the short-lived National Junior Hockey Alliance's "Alliance Cup," the only year in which this competition was contested.  The Rattlers swept the series 3-games-to-none.

2007–08
On December 30, 2007, the Rattlers hosted the Moscow Selects All-star team in an exhibition game.  The Selects won the game by a score of 8–4.  This was the second game of seven that the Moscow team played against different GMHL clubs.

In 2007–08, the Rattlers challenged their 31-game record for regular season games without a regulation loss, but came up short with a still impressive 28-game streak with a 5–3 January 6 loss to the Deseronto Storm.  The Rattlers did, however, set a new league record for regular season games without a regulation loss across multiple seasons with 38.  This also marked the end of the longest winning streak in GMHL history of 27 straight wins.

The Rattlers began the 2008 playoffs against the Toronto Canada Moose, whom they swept.  They then defeated the South Muskoka Shield 4-games-to-1.  In the league semifinals, they swept the Elliot Lake Bobcats and in the league finals they swept the Innisfil Lakers to win their second straight Russell Cup.

2008–09

On January 5, 2009, the Rattlers played against Kazakhstan's Torpedo UST-Kamenogorsk Under-18 squad in Shelburne, Ontario.  At one point leading 5–0, the Rattlers played a lot of their younger players in the second half of the game.  The final score was 6–5 for Bradford.

The Rattlers finished the 2008–09 season with the second best record in the South Division and third best in the league.  In the playoffs, the Rattlers first met the Toronto Canada Moose.  After winning the first two games, the Moose came back and took game three and four of the best-of-five series to force a decisive game five.  The Rattlers overcame the potential upset and won the series 3-games-to-2.  In the division semifinals, the Rattlers drew the Deseronto Storm.  The Rattlers took game one, but in game two and three the Storm took control.  The Rattlers had to win game four to prolong the best-of-five series, and succeeded with a 5–1 victory.  The next morning it was announced that the Deseronto Storm protested the result of game four due to a roster violation by Bradford.  Upon review of the league, the result of game four was overturned and the Rattlers were disqualified from the remainder of the playoffs.

2012–13
The 2008 championship passed and in the four following years four different teams would claim the Russell Cup as GMHL.  In those four years, the Rattlers failed to reach the finals in each of those years.  The 2012–13 led to the Rattlers turning in the league's first undefeated season with a 42–0–0–0 record.  There would be a black mark on this season though when the Rattlers competed in the league's showcase tournament in Bracebridge, Ontario, in late 2012.  They turned in a less than stellar performance and were ejected from the tournament, along with longtime rival South Muskoka Shield, for a brawl and an off-ice altercation involving crowd members and ejected players that caused a police investigation.  The Rattlers perfect season allowed them a date with the eighth seeded Lefroy Wave.  Sweeping the Wave in three games extended the Rattlers winning streak to 45 games.  They played the Bobcaygeon Bucks next, sweeping them in three games and extending their streak to 48 games.  In the South Division final, the Rattlers faced the Orangeville Americans and swept them in four games.  The series victory gave them a record of 52–0–0–0 so far that year.  The perfect streak was snapped the very next game in the league final by the Temiscaming Titans 7–6 in overtime.  Bradford would win games two and three to extend their record for streak of games without a regulation loss to 55 games before that streak was ended in regulation in game four by the Titans.  The Rattlers would win games five and six and the series to claim their third Russell Cup.

Season-by-season standings

(*) Standings incomplete.

Playoffs
2007 Won League, Won Alliance Cup
Bradford Rattlers defeated Deseronto Thunder 4-games-to-2 in semi-finals
Bradford Rattlers defeated King Wild 4-games-to-1 in finals
Bradford Rattlers defeated New Westminster Whalers 3-games-to-none in Alliance Cup
2008 Won League
Bradford Rattlers defeated Toronto Canada Moose 4-games-to-none in bye round
Bradford Rattlers defeated South Muskoka Shield 4-games-to-1 in quarter-finals
Bradford Rattlers defeated Elliot Lake Bobcats 4-games-to-none in semi-finals
Bradford Rattlers defeated Innisfil Lakers 4-games-to-none in finals
2009 Lost Division Semi-finals
Bradford Rattlers defeated Toronto Canada Moose 3-games-to-2 in division quarter-finals
Deseronto Storm defeated Bradford Rattlers 3-games-to-1 in division semi-finals
2010 Lost Semi-finals
Bradford Rattlers defeated Brock Bucks 3-games-to-none in quarter-finals
South Muskoka Shield defeated Bradford Rattlers 4-games-to-1 in semi-finals
2011 Lost Semi-finals
Bradford Rattlers defeated Deseronto Storm 3-games-to-none in quarter-finals
South Muskoka Shield defeated Bradford Rattlers 4-games-to-3 in semi-finals
2012 Lost Semi-finals
Bradford Rattlers defeated Lefroy Wave 3-games-to-2 in quarter-finals
Sturgeon Falls Lumberjacks defeated Bradford Rattlers 4-games-to-none in semi-finals
2013 Won League
Bradford Rattlers defeated Lefroy Wave 3-games-to-none in division quarter-finals
Bradford Rattlers defeated Bobcaygeon Bucks 3-games-to-none in division semi-finals
Bradford Rattlers defeated Orangeville Americans 4-games-to-none in division finals
Bradford Rattlers defeated Temiscaming Titans 4-games-to-2 in finals
2014 Lost Finals
Bradford Rattlers defeated Toronto Attack 3-games-to-none in division quarter-finals
Bradford Rattlers defeated Toronto Blue Ice Jets 3-games-to-1 in division semi-finals
Bradford Rattlers defeated Seguin Huskies 4-games-to-none in crossover series
Bradford Bulls defeated Bradford Rattlers 4-games-to-1 in finals
2015 Lost Division Semi-finals
Toronto Blue Ice Jets defeated Bradford Rattlers 3-games-to-2 in division semi-finals
2016 Lost Division Quarter-finals
Knights of Meaford defeated Bradford Rattlers 3-games-to-1 in division quarter-finals
2017 Lost Division Quarter-finals
Temiscaming Titans defeated Bradford Rattlers 3-games-to-1 in division quarter-finals
2018 Lost Division Finals
Bradford Rattlers defeated West Nipissing Lynx 2-games-to-none in division quarter-finals
Bradford Rattlers defeated Ville-Marie Pirates 3-games-to-2 in division semi-finals
Almaguin Spartans defeated Bradford Rattlers 4-games-to-none in division finals
2019 Lost Division Finals
Bradford Rattlers defeated Knights of Meaford 2-games-to-none in division quarter-finals
Bradford Rattlers defeated West Nipissing Lynx 3-games-to-none in division semi-finals
Ville-Marie Pirates defeated Bradford Rattlers 4-games-to-2 in division finals
2020 Postseason cancelled prior to completion
Bradford Rattlers defeated New Tecumseth Civics 2-games-to-none in division quarter-finals
Bradford Rattlers defeated Bradford Bulls 3-games-to-2 in division semi-finals
Temiscaming Titans led Bradford Rattlers 3-games-to-1 in division finals before the postseason was cancelled due to COVID-19 pandemic

Clarence Schmalz Cup appearances
1980: Leamington Flyers defeated Bradford Blues 4-games-to-none
1986: Norwich Merchants defeated Bradford Blues 4-games-to-3
1989: Bradford Bulls defeated Hanover Barons 4-games-to-2

Organization staff history

Notable alumni
Blues
Darrin Madeley

Noah Bell

References

External links
Rattlers Website
WHC Website

Ice hockey teams in Ontario
1971 establishments in Ontario
Ice hockey clubs established in 1971